Raleigh is an unincorporated community and coal town in Raleigh County, West Virginia, United States. Raleigh has a post office with ZIP code 25911.

The community was named for its location within Raleigh County. The Raleigh Coal and Coke Company was the primary mining company within this location.

Notable person
Lonnie Warwick, American football player, was born in Raleigh.

Gallery

References

External links

Unincorporated communities in Raleigh County, West Virginia
Unincorporated communities in West Virginia
Coal towns in West Virginia